Monflier Point is a point which marks the southwest end of Rabot Island in the Biscoe Islands of Antarctica. It was first charted and named by the Fourth French Antarctic Expedition, 1908–10, under Jean-Baptiste Charcot.

References

External links

Headlands of the Biscoe Islands